Renée Trent-Ganault was a French cross country and middle distance athlete.  She was a pioneer in women's distance running.

Career 

Trent-Ganault ran for  AS Philotechnique in 1925, and  Alsace Lorraine from Paris in 1926. She was  French Cross Country Champion in 1929,  1941 and 1942. She was selected for five international French teams before the war in  cross country.  Renee was ninth in the 1938 International Cross Country Championships.

Trent-Ganault was elected Cross Country woman of the century by the French Athletics Federation, because of her many victories between 1925 and 1946.

References 

French female middle-distance runners